Michał Łopaczewski (born 2 May 1989 in Poland) is a Polish motorcycle speedway rider who was a member of Poland U-19 national team.

Career details

European Championships 
 Individual U-19 European Championship:
 2007 - 9th place in Semi-Final 3
 2008 - 10th plac in Semi-Final 1
 Team U-19 European Championship:
 2008 -  Rawicz - 4th place (0 pts)

Domestic competitions 
 Individual Polish Championship
 2009 - 17th place in Quarter-Final 2 as track reserve
 Individual U-21 Polish Championship:
 2008 -  Rybnik - 16th place (0 pts)
 2009 - 14th place in Qualifying Round 1
 Polish Silver Helmet (U-21)
 2008 - windraw in Semi-Final 1
 2009 - 15th place in Semi-Final 2
 Polish Bronze Helmet (U-19)
 2008 -  Gdańsk - 7th place (8 pts)

See also 
 Poland national speedway team

References

External links 
 Lopaczewski.Racing.pl
 www.lopaczewski.za.pl

Polish speedway riders
1989 births
Living people
Polonia Bydgoszcz riders
Place of birth missing (living people)